The 1945–46 Southern League Cup was the sixth and final edition of the regional war-time football tournament. The North Eastern League and North Eastern League Cup had ended the previous season, teams from those competitions joined the Southern League and Southern League Cup. With the Southern League now acting effectively as a national league the competition was split into two Divisions, The league cup was therefore also split into two divisions.

Aberdeen won the tournament, defeating Rangers 3–2 in the final at Hampden Park before a crowd of 135,000. This was the last edition of the competition, but the trophy itself was used again for the 1946 Victory Cup played only a few weeks later (won by Rangers), therefore Aberdeen only possessed the cup for a short time. The same teams met in first official Scottish League Cup final the following year.

Group stage

Division A

Group A

Group B

Group C

Group D

Division B

Group A

Group B

Play-off

Group C

Group D

Quarter-finals

Semi-finals

Replay

Final

Teams

References

External links
Southern League Cup at Scottish Football Historical Archive (archived version, 2015)

season
1945–46 in Scottish football